Garba Tula Airport is an airport in Kenya.

Location
Garba Tula Airport  is located in Garba Tula District, Eastern Province, in the northeastern part of Kenya, near the town of Garba Tula.

The geographic coordinates of this airport are:0° 31' 12.00"N, 38° 30' 56.00"E (Latitude:0.520000; Longitude:38.515555).

Overview
Garba Tula Airport is a small civilian airport, serving Garba Tula and surrounding communities.

Airlines and destinations
None at the moment

See also
 Garba Tula
 Garba Tula District
 Eastern Province (Kenya)
 Kenya Airports Authority
 Kenya Civil Aviation Authority
 List of airports in Kenya

References

External links
   Location of Garba Tula Airport At Google Maps
   Website of Kenya Airports Authority

Airports in Kenya
Eastern Province (Kenya)